Mark Barkworth (alias Mark Lambert) was a Catholic priest and martyr (c. 1572 – 1601).

Born around 1572 at Searby, Lincolnshire, he studied for a time at Oxford, though no record remains of his stay there. Originally raised as a Protestant, he was received into the Catholic Church at Douai in 1593, by Father George, a Flemish Jesuit and entered the College there with a view to the priesthood. He matriculated at Douai University on 5 October 1594.

Due to an outbreak of the plague in 1596 Barkworth was sent to Rome and thence to the Royal College of St. Alban in Valladolid, Spain, where he entered the English College on 28 December 1596. On his way to Spain he is said to have had a vision of St Benedict, who told him he would die a martyr, in the Benedictine habit. While at Valladolid he made firmer contact with the Benedictine Order. He was ordained priest at the English College some time before July 1599, when he set out for the English Mission together with Father Thomas Garnet. On his way he stayed at the Benedictine Monastery of Hyrache in Navarre, where his wish to join the order was granted by his being made an Oblate with the privilege of making profession at the hour of death.

After having escaped from the hands of the Huguenots of La Rochelle, he was arrested on reaching England. and thrown into Newgate. At this time it was considered treason to be a priest in England who had been ordained abroad, and he was imprisoned for six months, and was then transferred to Bridewell. There he wrote an appeal to Robert Cecil, signed "George Barkworth". At his examinations he was reported to behave with fearlessness and frank gaiety. Having been condemned with a formal jury verdict, he was thrown into "Limbo", the horrible underground dungeon at Newgate, where he is said to have remained "very cheerful" till his death.

Barkworth was executed at Tyburn with Jesuit Roger Filcock and Anne Line, on 27 February 1601. He sang, on the way to Tyburn, the Paschal Anthem: "Hæc dies, quam fecit Dominus, exultemus et lætemur in ea" ("This is the day, the Lord has made, let us rejoice and be glad in it"). On his arrival he kissed the robe of Line, who was already dead, saying: "Ah, sister, thou hast got the start of us, but we will follow thee as quickly as we may"; and told the people that Pope St. Gregory had sent the Benedictine monks to evenglelize England, saying "I am come here to die, being a Catholic, a priest, and a religious man, belonging to the Order of St Benedict; it was by this same order that England was converted." He was said to be "a man of stature tall and well proportioned showing strength, the hair of his head brown, his beard yellow, somewhat heavy eyed". He was of a cheerful disposition. He suffered in the Benedictine habit, under which he wore a hair-shirt. It was noticed that his knees were, like St. James', hardened by constant kneeling, and an apprentice in the crowd picking up his legs, after the quartering, called out: "Which of you Gospellers can show such a knee?" Contrary to usual practice, the quarters of the priests were not exposed but buried near the scaffold.

Barkworth was beatified by Pope Pius XI on 15 December 1929.

See also
 Douai Martyrs

References

Sources
See: Godfrey Anstruther, Seminary Priests, St Edmund's College, Ware, 1968, vol. I, pp. 21–22, 116, 274-275.

1570s births
1601 deaths
Converts to Roman Catholicism
Alumni of the University of Oxford
English College, Douai alumni
English College, Valladolid alumni
English Benedictines
People from West Lindsey District
16th-century English Roman Catholic priests
English beatified people
People executed under Elizabeth I by hanging, drawing and quartering
Executed people from Lincolnshire
17th-century venerated Christians
One Hundred and Seven Martyrs of England and Wales